Young Lick is a mountain that lies in three Georgia counties, Habersham, Rabun and Towns.  Its summit - Young Lick Knob, elevation , is one of Habersham County's highest points.  Young Lick Knob is crossed by the Appalachian Trail.

The peak is geographically significant for two reasons.  First, it marks the point where Habersham, Rabun and Towns counties meet.  More importantly, Young Lick is a "triple-divide" peak on the Eastern Continental Divide, with rainfall from its summit flowing into three completely separate major basins.  To the northeast of the peak, water flows into the headwaters of the Savannah River and into the Atlantic Ocean.  To the southeast, water flows directly into the Gulf of Mexico via the Chattahoochee, then Apalachicola rivers.  To the west, water also flows to the Gulf, but it follows a less direct route via the Hiawassee, Tennessee, Ohio, and Mississippi river systems.

See also
 Knob Lick, Missouri

References

Sources
 Georgia's Named Summits - Habersham County

External links

 TopoQuest Map of Young Lick Knob

Mountains of Georgia (U.S. state)
Landforms of Habersham County, Georgia
Mountains of Rabun County, Georgia
Mountains of Towns County, Georgia
Mountains on the Appalachian Trail